Qeshlaq-e Gurchinlu Hajj Beyuk (also Romanized as Qeshlāq-e Gurchīnlū Ḩājj Beyūk) is a village in Qeshlaq-e Jonubi Rural District, Qeshlaq Dasht District, Bileh Savar County, Ardabil Province, Iran. At the 2006 census, its population was 61, in 14 families.

References 

Towns and villages in Bileh Savar County